Parshall is an unincorporated town, a post office, and a census-designated place (CDP) located in and governed by Grand County, Colorado, United States. The Parshall post office has the ZIP Code 80468. At the United States Census 2010, the population of the Parshall CDP was 47, while the population of the 80468 ZIP Code Tabulation Area was 391 including adjacent areas.

Geography
Parshall is located along the south side of U.S. Route 40 between Hot Sulphur Springs and Kremmling, on the north bank of the Colorado River downstream from Byers Canyon. 

Climate
This climate type is dominated by the winter season, a long, bitterly cold period with short, clear days, relatively little precipitation mostly in the form of snow, and low humidity.  According to the Köppen Climate Classification system, Parshall has a subarctic climate, abbreviated "Dfc" on climate maps.

Demographics

Commerce and industry
The Henderson Mill on County Road 3 is the most significant local industry. It processes molybdenum ore derived from the Henderson Mine in Clear Creek County, just over the Continental Divide. There are tourist facilities, such as the Bar Lazy J Guest Ranch (founded 1912), Colorado Cannabis School, the Aspen Canyon Ranch, and fishing areas along the Colorado River and the Williams Fork and Reservoir. Cattle ranching occupies much of the lower areas.

See also

Outline of Colorado
Index of Colorado-related articles
State of Colorado
Colorado cities and towns
Colorado census designated places
Colorado counties
Grand County, Colorado
Phillips-Williams Fork Reservoir Site
Williams Fork Reservoir

References

External links

Parshall @ Colorado.com
Parshall @ UncoverColorado.com
History of Parshall
Parshall, Colorado Mining Claims And Mines
Grand County website

Census-designated places in Grand County, Colorado
Census-designated places in Colorado